These are lists of people from Quebec by region.

Lists 
List of people from Bas-Saint-Laurent
List of people from Saguenay–Lac-Saint-Jean
List of people from Capitale-Nationale
List of people from Mauricie
List of people from Estrie
List of people from the Montreal region
List of people from Outaouais
List of people from Abitibi-Témiscamingue
List of people from Côte-Nord
List of people from Nord-du-Québec
List of people from the Gaspé Peninsula
List of people from Chaudière-Appalaches
List of people from the Laval region
List of people from Lanaudière
List of people from Laurentides
List of people from Montérégie
List of people from Centre-du-Québec

See also 
List of people from Montreal
List of people from Quebec City
List of Quebecers
List of regions of Quebec
Quebec